The Province of Barletta-Andria-Trani is a province of Italy in the Apulia region. The establishment of the province took effect in June 2009, and Andria was appointed as its seat of government on 21 May 2010.

It was created from 10 municipalities (comuni), which were formerly in the provinces of Bari and Foggia, taking its name from the three cities which share the new province's administrative functions. The total population of the 10 municipalities comprising the new province was 383,018 at the 2001 census.

Cities 
(With populations at the 2001 census)

 Andria (100,014) [from Province of Bari]
 Barletta (92,094) [from Province of Bari]
 Bisceglie (51,718) [from Province of Bari]
 Canosa di Puglia (31,445) [from Province of Bari]
 Margherita di Savoia (12,585) [from Province of Foggia]
 Minervino Murge (10,213) [from Province of Bari]
 San Ferdinando di Puglia (14,361) [from Province of Foggia]
 Spinazzola (7,362) [from Province of Bari]
 Trani (53,139) [from Province of Bari]
 Trinitapoli (14,448) [from Province of Foggia]

Government

Gallery

References

External links 
 www.trani.biz Trani city web site
 www.barlettaweb.com Barletta city web site
 www.andriaweb.com Andria city web site
 www.bisceglieweb.com Bisceglie city web site
 Canosa city web site

 
Barletta-Andria-Trani